George Rowe (born 23 August 1968) is a former Scottish professional footballer who played as a centre-back for Clydebank, Arbroath, Queen of the South and Stirling Albion.

Clydebank
Rowe started his senior career with Clydebank at the start of the 1989-90 season, having previously played with Kilpatrick Juveniles for a few years. Rowe played in 91 league appearances and scored 10 goals in three seasons at the Kilbowie Park club.

Queen of the South
Rowe then signed for Queen of the South in Dumfries at the start of the 1992-93 season where he remained for the next 8 years. In his final season at Palmerston Park, Rowe was appointed joint player-manager alongside Ken Eadie and towards the end of that season Hamilton Academical were deducted 15 points for failing to play a match because of a players' strike. This resulted in Queens escaping relegation to the bottom tier of Scottish football by 4 points, as the club had 29 points to the Accies 25 points. With Queens chairman Norman Blount injecting much needed capital into Queens revival, some of Rowe's team-mates included Tommy Bryce, Jim Thomson and Andy Aitken, as the Doonhamers reached the 1997–98 Scottish Challenge Cup Final, narrowly defeated 1-0 by Falkirk in a battling performance. Most notably, Derek Townsley, who  moved on to play for Motherwell, Hibernian and Gretna, missed a gilt-edged chance to equalise in the closing minutes of the match. Jamie McAllister, who went on to play for Aberdeen, Livingston and Hearts in Scotland and also Bristol City, Yeovil Town and Exeter City in England was also a used substitute in the closing minutes of the match.

Rowe played in 184 league matches for the Doonhamers and scored 17 goals in his 8 years with the Dumfries club.

Arbroath
Rowe then signed for the Red Lichties at the start of the 2000-01 season and stayed at Gayfield Park for two years, playing in 64 league matches and scored 9 goals.

Stirling Albion
Rowe then signed for Stirling Albion at the start of the 2002-03 season and stayed at Forthbank for three years, playing in 84 league matches and scored 7 goals before retiring through injury at the end of the 2004-05 season.

References

Living people
1968 births
Footballers from Glasgow
Scottish footballers
Association football central defenders
Queen of the South F.C. players
Clydebank F.C. (1965) players
Arbroath F.C. players
Stirling Albion F.C. players
Scottish Football League players
Scottish football managers
Queen of the South F.C. managers
Scottish Football League managers